Manipulation may refer to:
Manipulation (psychology) - the action of manipulating someone in a clever or unscrupulous way

Crowd manipulation - use of crowd psychology to direct the behavior of a crowd toward a specific action
Internet manipulation - co-opting of digital technology (algorithms, automated scripts) for commercial, social or political purpose
Media manipulation - creating an image or argument in the news that favors partisan interests
Market manipulation - interfering with the free and fair operation of financial markets.

Object manipulation
Robotic manipulation
 Manipulator (device)
Card manipulation
Coin manipulation
Hat manipulation

Medical therapy manipulation
Joint manipulation
Spinal manipulation

Data manipulation
Bit manipulation
Photo manipulation

Mathematics and science
Manipulation of atoms by optical field
Manipulative (mathematics education)
Symbolic Manipulation Program
Manipulator (insect), an extinct predatory cockroach

In entertainment
Manipulation (film), a 1991 British animated short film
Manipulated (album), a remix album by Gravity Kills
 Manipulator (The Fall of Troy album), 2007
 Manipulator (EP), an EP by Arsenal
 Manipulator (Ty Segall album), 2014